Joseph "Joe" Milner CBE, QFSM (born, October 1922 in Manchester, England, UK – died, 13 January 2007 in Caston, Norfolk, England, UK) was a senior officer in the British fire service.

Born in Manchester in 1922, on leaving the army in 1946, he began his career with the Fire Brigades of Middlesbrough, Scarborough, and the North Riding of Yorkshire. He joined the Hong Kong Fire Services in 1951.

He was Director of the Hong Kong Fire Services from 1965 to 1970 and Chief Fire Officer, of the London Fire Brigade from 1970 to 1976.

He was the Chief Fire Officer, present during the Moorgate tube crash aftermath, in 1975. He famously quoted 'my thousand selfless heroes', in dedication to the literal 1000 firefighters who spent 5 days rescuing survivors.

Family
1st wife Bella Grice-Flinton, (born,Staxton, North Yorkshire, died 1976) – had 2 children (Patricia and Frederick (dec'd)),
2nd wife Anne Milner – married 1976 until his death in 2007- no children,
Joyce Woodhouse – sister,
William Milner – brother,
Henry Milner, QPM-awarded British policeman, was his brother.

Burma Campaign
Milner fought in the Burma campaign as a Chindit. There is a story that has been passed down through the family of Milner, that when the Japanese surrounded his camp, and his men nervously asked him what they should do, he gave the orders to set up a banquet in order to show the Japanese that they did not fear them. Joseph Milner wrote a fictional, book based on his experiences called "To Blazes With Glory: A Chindit's war", about a soldier called Badger who fights in the campaign.

References
Hong Kong Government Records Office. Archival copy of: Information Services Department, Publishing Division, Editorial Section. Feature: A "passion" for fire prevention – Hong Kong man to head London Fire Brigade. by Adam Lynford.
Hong Kong Fire Services (photo) 

1922 births
2007 deaths
London Fire Brigade personnel
Commanders of the Order of the British Empire
Hong Kong civil servants
People from Manchester
People from Breckland District
Recipients of the Queen's Fire Service Medal
Military personnel from Manchester
British Army personnel of World War II
British Army soldiers